Lyndonville can refer to:
Lyndonville, New York
Lyndonville, Vermont